Paulo Murinello (born Mozambique, 4 May 1974) is a former Portuguese rugby union player and a current coach. He played as a flanker. He last played for Cascais. He's also a student of Sport Gestion at the Faculdade de Motricidade Humana, in Lisbon.

Murinello had 54 caps for Portugal, from 1993 to 2007, scoring 2 try, 10 points in aggregate. He scored the only Portuguese try in the 11-102 loss to Wales, in Lisbon, at 18 May 1994, for the 1995 Rugby World Cup qualifyings. It was the first time Portugal ever played a then Five Nations Championship country. Murinello was in the squad for the 2007 Rugby World Cup finals, playing in all the four matches.

References

External links

Paulo Murinello blog 

1974 births
Living people
Portuguese rugby union coaches
Portuguese rugby union players
Mozambican rugby union players
Mozambican people of Portuguese descent
Rugby union flankers
Sportspeople from Cascais
Portugal international rugby union players